Pho Tak is a district (amphoe) of Nong Khai province, northeastern Thailand.

Geography
Neighboring districts are (from the west clockwise): Sangkhom, Si Chiang Mai, and Tha Bo of Nong Khai Province, and Ban Phue of Udon Thani province.

History
The minor district (king amphoe) was created on 1 July 1997 by splitting off the three tambons, Pho Tak, Phon Thong, and Dan Si Suk, from Si Chiang Mai district.

On 15 May 2007, all 81 minor districts were upgraded to full districts. With publication in the Royal Gazette on 24 August, the upgrade became official.

Administration
The district is divided into three sub-districts (tambons), which are further subdivided into 27 villages (mubans). There are no municipal (thesaban) areas. There are three tambon administrative organizations (TAO).

References

External links
amphoe.com

Pho Tak